Dashte Barchi is a settlement located in western Kabul, Afghanistan. Previously barren and agricultural, Dashte Barchi became populated in the early 2000s by newcomers from the provinces, mostly ethnic Hazaras from Maidan Wardak, Ghazni and Parwan, and some Kochi Pashtuns. It is mostly informally-developed. Over 95% of population of Dashte Barchi are Hazara.

On August 15, 2016, a suicide attack took place in this neighborhood, targeting an educational center called "The Promised Mehdi". The bomber struck shortly after noon in front of a crowd of 5,000, mostly students of the Hazara ethnic group who were preparing for university. 34 students were killed and 56 were injured in the attack. Due to its majority Shia population, the district is a constant target for the extremist Sunni militias.

See also 
 Kabul

References 

Neighborhoods of Kabul